Dil-e-Gumshuda (initially titled Margh-E-Ishq Se Pehle) is a 2019 Pakistani romantic television soap opera, produced by Abdullah Kadwani and Asad Qureshi, under their production banner 7th Sky Entertainment. It has Hina Altaf and Agha Ali in lead roles with Amar Khan as an antagonist. The soap received high TRPs throughout its run. The performance of Khan as an antagonist received praise from critics.

Synopsis 
Dil-e-Gumshuda revolves around the themes of rivalry, revenge, and jealousy between two cousin sisters, Zara (Hina Altaf) and Alizay (Amar Khan). Zara hails from a middle class family and after the sad demise of her parents she is forced to move in with her uncle's family where she meets her cousin Alizay for the first time. Alizay is a self-centred and manipulative girl who cannot share her life with anyone, not even with her fiance Daniyal (Agha Ali). When Zara moves in, Alizay and her mother make it difficult for her to adjust as they humiliate and scold her for being an outsider. Both of them play multiple tricks to demean Zara in front of everyone and even steal the love of her life, Nadeem (Mirza Zain Baig). Zara is shattered when she finds out about Nadeem's change of mind and comes face-to-face with the harsh realities of life.

Will Zara continue to suffer under the atrocities implicated by Alizay or will she take a stand for herself?

Cast
Hina Altaf as Zara 
Agha Ali as Daniyal
Amar Khan as Alizeh 
Mirza Zain Baig as Nadeem
Shamim Hilaly as Khalida Aapa; Daniyal's mother
Zainab Qayyum as Shazia; Alizeh's mother
Khalid Anam as Jamal; Alizeh's father
Humaira Bano as Nadeem's mother
Anumta Qureshi as Reema; Nadeem's sister
Ramsha Akmal as Nadeem's younger sister
Fazila Kaiser as Zara's mother

Soundtrack 
Dil-e-Gumshuda's original soundtrack is composed by Naveed Naushad and vocals are provided by Nabeel Shaukat and Beena Khan. The lyrics are penned down by Fatima Najeeb.

International release
The show was dubbed in Arabic under the title الحب الضائع and is available for streaming on Viu MENA. The show started airing in India from 6 June 2022, on Atrangii channel.

References

2019 Pakistani television series debuts
2019 Pakistani television series endings
Geo TV original programming